Kerberized Internet Negotiation of Keys (KINK) is a protocol defined in RFC 4430 used to set up an IPsec security association (SA), similar to Internet Key Exchange (IKE), utilizing the Kerberos protocol to allow trusted third parties to handle authentication of peers and management of security policies in a centralized fashion.

Its motivation is given in RFC 3129 as an alternative to IKE, in which peers must each use X.509 certificates for authentication, use Diffie–Hellman key exchange (DH) for encryption, know and implement a security policy for every peer with which it will connect, with authentication of the X.509 certificates either pre-arranged or using DNS, preferably with DNSSEC. Utilizing Kerberos, KINK peers must only mutually authenticate with the appropriate Authentication Server (AS), with a key distribution center (KDC) in turn controlling distribution of keying material for encryption and therefore controlling the IPsec security policy.

Protocol description 

KINK is a command/response protocol that can create, delete, and maintain IPsec SAs.  Each command or response contains a common header along with a set of type-length-value payloads.  The type of a command or a response constrains the payloads sent in the messages of the exchange.

KINK itself is a stateless protocol in that each command or response does not require storage of hard state for KINK. This is in contrast to IKE, which uses Main Mode to first establish an Internet Security Association and Key Management Protocol (ISAKMP) SA followed by subsequent Quick Mode exchanges.

KINK uses Kerberos mechanisms to provide mutual authentication and replay protection.  For establishing SAs, KINK provides confidentiality for the payloads that follow the Kerberos AP-REQ payload. The design of KINK mitigates denial of service attacks by requiring authenticated exchanges before the use of any public key operations and the installation of any state. KINK also provides a means of using Kerberos User-to-User mechanisms when there is not a key shared between the server and the KDC. This is typically, but not limited to, the case with IPsec peers using PKINIT for initial authentication.

KINK directly reuses Quick Mode payloads defined in section 5.5 of IKE, with some minor changes and omissions. In most cases, KINK exchanges are a single command and its response.  An optional third message is required when creating SAs, only if the responder rejects the first proposal from the initiator or wants to contribute the keying materials. KINK also provides rekeying and Dead Peer Detection.

Packet format 

The KINK message includes the following fields:

 type: CREATE, DELETE, REPLY, GETTGT, ACK, STATUS, or private use
 version: the major protocol version number
 length: length of the entire message
 domain of interpretation (DOI): a DOI as defined in the Internet Security Association and Key Management Protocol (ISAKMP)
 transaction ID (XID): identification the transaction, defined as a command, a reply, and an optional acknowledgement
 next payload: type of the first payload after the message header as KINK_DONE, KINK_AP_REQ, KINK_AP_REP, KINK_KRB_ERROR, KINK_TGT_REQ, KINK_TGT_REP, KINK_ISAKMP, KINK_ENCRYPT, or KINK_ERROR
 ACK or ACKREQ bit: 1 if responder requires an explicit acknowledgement that a REPLY was received otherwise 0
 checksum length: length in bytes of the cryptographic checksum of the message
 payloads: a list of Type/Length/Value (TLV) payloads
 checksum: Kerberos keyed checksum over the entire message excluding the checksum field itself

Payloads 

KINK payloads are defined as:

 next payload: type of the first payload
 length: length of the payload

The following payloads are defined:

 KINK_AP_REQ: a payload that relays a Kerberos AP-REQ to the responder
 KINK_AP_REP: a payload that relays a Kerberos AP-REP to the initiator
 KINK_KRB_ERROR: a payload that relays Kerberos type errors back to the initiator
 KINK_TGT_REQ: a payload that provides a means to get a TGT from the peer in order to obtain a User-to-User service ticket from the KDC
 KINK_TGT_REP: a payload that contains the TGT requested in a previous KINK_TGT_REQ payload of a GETTGT command
 KINK_ISAKMP: a payload to encapsulate the ISAKMP IKE Quick Mode (phase 2) payloads, to allow backward compatibility with IKE and ISAKMP if there are subsequent revisions
 KINK_ENCRYPT: a payload to encapsulate other KINK payloads and is encrypted using the session key and the algorithm specified by its etype
 KINK_ERROR: a payload that returns an error condition

Implementations 

The following open source implementations of KINK are currently available:
 Racoon2 from the WIDE Project.

See also 
 Internet Key Exchange

References 

IPsec
Cryptographic protocols